The 1967 Montana State Bobcats football team was an American football team that represented Montana State University in the Big Sky Conference during the 1967 NCAA College Division football season. In their fifth and final season under head coach Jim Sweeney, the Bobcats compiled a 7–3 record (4–0 against Big Sky opponents) and won the conference championship.

Schedule

References

Montana State
Montana State Bobcats football seasons
Montana State Bobcats football